Molly Kreklow (born February 17, 1992) is an American indoor volleyball player who plays for Eczacıbaşı VitrA. Kreklow is a current member of the United States women's national volleyball team. Kreklow attended the University of Missouri for four years where she became a first team All-American.

Career
She played college women's volleyball at the University of Missouri.

Kreklow was part of the USA national team that won the 2015 FIVB World Grand Prix gold medal and a Best Setter award.

References

External links
 Profile at USA Volleyball
 Profile at MU

1992 births
Living people
American women's volleyball players
Missouri Tigers women's volleyball players
People from Wright County, Minnesota
Setters (volleyball)
American expatriate sportspeople in Turkey
Expatriate volleyball players in Turkey